Varanus timorensis, the Timor monitor or spotted tree monitor, is a species of small monitor lizards native to the island of Timor and some adjacent islands.

Taxonomy
Kimberley rock monitors (Varanus glauerti), banded tree monitors (Varanus scalaris), and spotted tree monitors (Varanus similis) were once considered subspecies of the Timor monitor, but have since been elevated to full species status.

Currently, the peacock monitor (Varanus auffenbergi) is sometimes considered a subspecies, but is usually considered its own species.

Description
The Timor monitor is a dwarf species of monitor lizard belonging to the subgenus Odatria. Generally, it is dark greenish-gray to almost black in background color, with bright gold-yellow or sometimes bluish spotting along its dorsal surface and a lighter straw-yellow color on its ventral side. It has a pointed snout, excellent eyesight and hearing, sharp teeth, and a prehensile tail that measures two-thirds of its  total length. V. timorensis also has long, sharp claws well-suited for climbing and defense. The species grows to a maximum of 61 cm, and weighs between 100 and 350 g.

Habitat
Varanus timorensis live in hollowed trees and branches, the spotted coloration helps them camouflage into the surrounding habitats.

Behavior
Timor monitors are arboreal, diurnal lizards. Their diet consist of a variety of invertebrates, such as scorpions, orthopterans, spiders, mantids, bees and cockroaches, and other lizards, such as geckos, as well as small snakes. Breeding takes place from December to March, and clutches of up to 11 eggs are laid; the eggs incubate three to four months, depending on the average temperature. Hatchlings are about 5 in long, but grow quickly.

Geographic distribution
The Timor monitor is found in Indonesia, specifically the islands of Timor, Savu, and Rote, and in East Timor.

In captivity
Frequently bred in captivity, this monitor is also still imported in small numbers for the exotic pet trade. Wild-caught specimens can be nervous and difficult to handle, but captive-raised animals are much less shy.

Its small size makes it an attractive choice for any varanid enthusiast, as they are easily housed in an enclosure oriented towards vertical climbing space (optimally a custom enclosure of 4′×2′×2′, or larger for pairs and groups), ample hiding spots, a basking area between 120 and 150 °F, with ambient temperatures between 78 and 90 °F. A medium-sized bowl of water is recommended for the occasional soak, or the cage can be misted once every few days to maintain humidity between 40% and 60%.

They readily feed on a diet of commercially available crickets, roaches, mealworms, and occasionally mice.

References

 King, Dennis & Green, Brian. 1999. Goannas: The Biology of Varanid Lizards. University of New South Wales Press. 

Varanus
Reptiles of Indonesia
Reptiles of Timor
Reptiles described in 1831
Taxa named by John Edward Gray